Clifty is an unincorporated community in Madison County, Arkansas, United States. It is located on Arkansas Highway 12.

The outstanding baseball player Arky Vaughan was born in Clifty.

References

Unincorporated communities in Madison County, Arkansas
Unincorporated communities in Arkansas